Actia sternalis is a species of tachinid flies in the genus Actia of the family Tachinidae.

Distribution
Yukon.

References

Insects described in 1991
Diptera of North America
sternalis